Lützow was the tenth ship of the German Feldherren-Klasse of passenger ships. She was launched in 1907, seized by the British in 1914, renamed to Huntsend, and eventually scrapped in 1932.

German career
The ship's German career began with a maiden voyage from Bremerhaven to New York City on 11 April 1908.

British career

On 3 August 1914, Lützow was seized by the British in the Suez Canal. She was put to use as a troopship under the name Huntsend, and was also used as a Hospital Ship evacuating troops from Gallipoli in 1915.

Torpedo attack
On 3 January 1917 near Crete, the Huntsend was damaged by a torpedo fired by the German U-boat . On 4 January at 11:15 am,  reported receiving 5 military officers and 6 mercantile ratings who were survivors from the Huntsend, which had been towed to port.

In April 1917, the Wallsend Slipway & Engineering Company reported that the damaged ship was in a dry dock in Tyne and Wear, England.

Influenza outbreak
During the 1918 flu pandemic, the Huntsend departed Montreal on 26 September 1918 with 649 Canadian soldiers on board. Before the ship had left port, the ship's doctor had reported concerns about 15 of the passengers who were already sick with influenza and pneumonia. Despite his reported concerns, the ship sailed, and five percent of the 649 Canadians died before the ship disembarked on 11 October 1918. Some, if not all, of these men were buried at Beaumont-Hamel Newfoundland Memorial a memorial site in France. Some of those infected died at a later date.

Return to Germany
In 1923, Norddeutscher Lloyd bought the ship back and returned her to passenger services.

References

Ships built in Bremen (state)
1907 ships
Troop ships of the Royal Navy
Spanish flu